Ali Usman (born 6 June 1993) is a Pakistani cricketer. He made his first-class debut for Pakistan International Airlines in the 2016–17 Quaid-e-Azam Trophy on 22 October 2016.

He was the joint-leading wicket-taker for Multan in the 2018–19 Quaid-e-Azam Trophy, with twenty-two dismissals in five matches. Ali Usman is at the moment close to be joining the International Pakistan team as he has an emerging central contract and has beated many records throughout his career.  He made his Twenty20 debut for Multan in the 2018–19 National T20 Cup on 15 December 2018.

References

External links
 

1993 births
Living people
Pakistani cricketers
Multan cricketers
Pakistan International Airlines cricketers
Place of birth missing (living people)
Southern Punjab (Pakistan) cricketers